Mohamed bin Issa Al Jaber (born in 1959 (in Jeddah) is an Arab businessman.

Business
In 1982, Al Jaber founded Jadawel International Construction & Development.  He is founder, chairman and CEO of the MBI Group. He owns 80% of the Group. The MBI Group activities include various entities including the following companies:

 JJW Hotels & Resorts, including luxury hotels in Austria, France, Portugal and the United Kingdom, Amarante 4-star hotels in France, Portugal and Egypt as well as Median 3-star hotels Stars budget hotels in France
 Jadawel International, a company developing residential compounds for expatriates in Saudi Arabia
 Continentoil, and oil field services and petroleum company
 Al Jaber is also a shareholder of AJWA Group for Food Industries, an agricultural and food processing company

Al Jaber was listed as a billionaire in March 2013 by Forbes and in May 2014 featured in The Sunday Times Rich List at number 13, the highest entry for an Arab. Arabian Business's 2013 rich list 'The world's richest Arabs' puts Al Jaber at number 2 with $12.66bn. Bloomberg Billionaires reported his net worth as $7.19BN as of August 2018.

Portugal
In September 2003, Al Jaber took over the management of Quinta Vale Da Gondra Hotel e SPA (Unipessoal) Lda.

In January 2008, Portuguese press revealed that Al Jaber is expanding his business in the Algarve and investing about €200 million to buy the Hotel Dona Filipa in Vale do Lobo, the golf course San Lourenzo in Quinta do Lago, the Hotel Penina and its 3 golf courses from Starman (a joint venture between the Lehman Brothers bank and Starwood Capital Group). Other assets in the regions are the Pinheiros Altos Golf Resort and the Formosa Hotel. In 2013 JJW Hotels and Resorts took over the management of the Penina Hotel and Golf Resort, and also announced plans for a major refurbishment of the Dona Filipa. Mohsen MBI Al Jaber, son of Mohamed Bin Issa Al Jaber, has held the role of Vice President of the Portugal sector of the MBI Group since October 2015.

Austria

In 2002, Al Jaber acquired the famous Grand Hotel, Vienna from the Japanese airline All Nippon Airways. He later acquired the premises of a former bank on Kärntner Ring and converted the building to the boutique Ring Hotel.

In October 2006, Al Jaber bought the Palais Corso, Vienna's premier luxury shopping and office complex from Generali Versicherung, for about €70 million.

In 2007, Al Jaber agreed to invest 10% in the building of the Vienna Tourism University (Modul University Vienna), a project handled by the Vienna Economic Chamber and provided scholarships for students there both personally and through his Foundation.

Also in 2007, JJW signed an agreement for the takeover and the expansion of the Palace Schwarzenberg Hotel in Vienna, along with Magnat Real Estate. However, delays to the project led to its cancellation. The Austrian press noted in this regard that numerous payment commitments of Al Jaber had remained unfulfilled and had led to recriminations and threats of lawsuits.

In the beginning of 2008, Al Jaber proposed to help the financially troubled Austrian Airlines with investments through taking a 20% stake in the company. However, he withdrew his offer in May 2008 after the company published its negative quarterly results, based on the grounds that the company intentionally withheld the actual level of trouble faced. Auditor Herbert Heiser, who was called by the court to consult in the legal dispute between AUA and Al Jaber, agreed with Al Jaber's conclusions.  He states in his report that rather than its officially declared profit of €3.3 million, the AUA should have revealed a hefty loss – of around €235 million.

In July 2008, Al Jaber took a 60% stake in Kneissl Holding GmbH, an Austrian manufacturer of sports equipment. JJA Beteiligungsverwaltungs GmbH bought the entire company in December 2012 for €1,98 million and subsequently let it lapse into insolvency because he did not inject funds he had committed earlier.

In 2008 Vienna's Trialog Institut named Al Jaber 'Man of the Year' for his work in promoting inter-cultural understanding. Presenting the award, Karl Blecha, former Federal Minister of the Interior and of the Austrian-Arabic Association, praised Al Jaber for his work towards building bridges through education and understanding and his support of peace, tolerance and democracy.

In May 2011, Al Jaber publicly denounced a defamation campaign by Austrian Media which had sought to imply financial difficulties in some of the companies that Al Jaber had invested in. He accused the newspapers of reporting a one-sided version of events.

In October 2020, Sheikh Mohamed bin Issa al Jaber and Robert Zadrazil, CEO of Bank Austria UniCredit, reached an amicable end to a legal dispute that had existed since 2012 following constructive discussions between the parties. As part of the resolution, the two business leaders have committed to work together in an attempt to strengthen the Austrian economy.

London

In 2007, Al Jaber expanded the portfolio of the Guernsey-based JJW Hotels & Resorts group by acquiring The Eton Collection hotels for a reported £70 million.

France
The Group opened their first office in France in 1991.

The hotel empire of Al Jaber was initially started in France in 1988 and expanded to over 35 hotel properties in France and almost 80 in Europe.

In October 2008, it was announced that the Group planned to acquire a number of hotels in France from the Starwood Capital Group for $2billion but the deal was not concluded.

Personal life and philanthropy
Personal

Al Jaber is married and has three children. His children are all Trustees of the MBI Al Jaber Foundation. In 2007, Al Jaber obtained Austrian nationality.

In 2009, MBI Al Jaber released his first book, 'Yes, the Arabs can too' (Arabic 2009, English 2013, German 2015). The book provides a contemporary Arab view on the changes that are being wrought both economically and socially across the region.

Philanthropy

MBI Al Jaber is the founder and Chairman of the MBI Al Jaber Foundation, founded in 2002.

MBI Al Jaber is the founding patron and donor of the London Middle East Institute at SOAS and has endowed the MBI Al Jaber Chair in Middle East Studies. He is on the advisory board of the Middle East Centre of the London School of Economics (LSE).

The MBI Al Jaber Foundation is the main sponsor of the International Association for the Study of Arabia (formerly the British Foundation for the Study of Arabia), a UK Registered Charity which exists to promote research relating to the Arabian Peninsula.

In 2003, MBI Al Jaber donated SR21 million to Dar Al-Hekma University for women in Jeddah.

The MBI Al Jaber Foundation is a leading supporter of Connecting Cultures, an intercultural educational program that creates close ties and greater understanding between young people of varying backgrounds. Connecting Cultures has been cited by the UN Alliance of Civilisations as one of the world's leading civil society initiatives.

MBI Al Jaber was co-founding patron of the Olive Tree Programme at City, University of London, which ran from 2004 to 2016. The programme brought Israeli and Palestinian students together to study in London. Olive Tree Alumni include Stav Shaffir, who became the youngest female Knesset member in Israel's history.

In 2009, MBI Al Jaber was cited as a leading exponent of good philanthropic practices in the Centre for Social Cohesion's  publication, A Degree of Influence:    
 MBI Al Jaber's personal views on philanthropy can be found in an interview in Philanthropy Age magazine.

Capital projects supported by the MBI Al Jaber Foundation include the MBI Al Jaber Building 
 at Corpus Christi College, University of Oxford; The MBI Al Jaber Grand Hall  at the University of Westminster; and to enable the relocation of the London Middle East Institute at SOAS amongst others. A donation to the London School of Hygiene and Tropical Medicine for their epidemiology research centre was announced in May 2020.

The MBI Al Jaber Foundation works closely with UNESCO on a number of issues and projects, including: support for the Euro-Arab Dialogue Initiative; Educational reform in countries such as Algeria and Yemen; and the Kitab fi Jarida ‘a book in a newspaper’ project. In 2005, MBI Al Jaber was nominated by the UNESCO Director General as their personal representative for "education, human rights, tolerance, and cultures to build peace and democracy."

Between 2013 and 2015, the MBI Al Jaber Foundation spent approx £1.2m; it spent £114,000 in 2016; and less than £40,000 in 2017.

In 2013 the MBI Al Jaber Foundation launched a Media Training Institute in Sana'a, Yemen; with a view to promoting a free press, the institute offered free courses in all types of journalism and broadcasting. This and a number of other projects have currently been paused due to the ongoing volatility in the region.

Recognition
Al Jaber holds the following honorary degrees and awards:
 the Project Aladdin 2017 Dialogue of Cultures Award (2017) 
 an Honorary Senatorship from the MODUL University Vienna (2013) 
 an Honorary Fellowship from UCL, London (2012)
 an Honorary Fellowship from Corpus Christi College, Oxford (2009)
 UN Spokesperson for Global Forums on Reinventing Government (2007) 
 an Honorary Doctor of Science degree from City University, London (2004)
 an Honorary Doctor of Letters degree from the University of Westminster (2004)
 an Honorary Fellowship of London University at the School of Oriental and African Studies (2002)
 UNESCO Special Envoy for Education, Tolerance, and Cultures to build peace and democracy (2004)
 the ALECSO Gold Medal, for his support of UNESCO projects aimed at promoting education, culture and scientific activities in the Arab World
 a Gold Medal of honour for special achievements in the economic and cross-cultural educational sectors of Vienna, presented by the Mayor of Vienna
 the Islamic Educational, Scientific and Cultural Organization (ISESCO) Gold Medal, in recognition of his efforts to promote coexistence and foster a culture of tolerance and dialogue in a bid to enhance international cooperation.

References

External links
 Mohamed Bin Issa Al Jaber's Website
 Website of the MBI Al Jaber Foundation
 The MBI Alumni Association website
 The World's Billionaires 2009 - Forbes.com

20th-century Saudi Arabian businesspeople
21st-century Saudi Arabian businesspeople
1959 births
Living people
Alumni of the University of London
Fellows of Corpus Christi College, Oxford
Saudi Arabian billionaires
Saudi Arabian expatriates in France
Saudi Arabian emigrants to Austria
Saudi Arabian emigrants to the United Kingdom
British billionaires
Naturalised citizens of Austria
Naturalised citizens of the United Kingdom
Austrian billionaires
People from Jeddah